The 2002 WGC-World Cup took place 12–15 December at the Vista Vallarta Club de Golf, Nicklaus Course in Puerto Vallarta, Mexico. It was the 48th World Cup and the third as a World Golf Championship event. 24 countries competed and each country sent two players. The prize money totaled $3,000,000 with $1,000,000 going to the winning pair. The Japanese team of Toshimitsu Izawa and Shigeki Maruyama won. They won by two strokes stroke over the American team of Phil Mickelson and David Toms.

Qualification and format
18 teams qualified based on the Official World Golf Ranking and were joined by host country, Mexico, and five teams via qualifiers in Malaysia and Mexico.

The tournament was a 72-hole stroke play team event with each team consisting of two players. The first and third days were fourball play and the second and final days were foursomes play.

Teams

Source

Scores

Source

References

External links
Vista Vallarta Club de Golf

World Cup (men's golf)
Golf tournaments in Mexico
Sport in Jalisco
WGC-World Cup
World Cup golf
World Cup golf
World Cup golf